Jared Isaacman (born February 11, 1983) is an American entrepreneur, pilot, philanthropist, and commercial astronaut. He is the founder, CEO of Draken International, a private air force provider and Shift4 Payments, a payment processor.  As of February 2023, his estimated net worth is US$2 billion.

Isaacman was the commander of Inspiration4, a private spaceflight using SpaceX's Crew Dragon Resilience, launched from Kennedy Space Center in Florida on September 16, 2021. The mission was part of a fundraiser for St. Jude Children's Research Hospital, to which Isaacman pledged to donate $100 million.

Isaacman will command the Polaris Dawn mission, the first private spaceflight in a series of missions named the Polaris Program. Isaacman is currently undergoing commercial astronaut training at SpaceX.

Early life 
Jared Isaacman was born on February 11, 1983, to Donald and Sandra Marie Isaacman. He is Jewish, although he has said he is not a religious person despite donating to synagogues. He is a youngest child, and has three siblings: two brothers, Marc and Michael, and a sister, Tiffany. While living in Westfield, New Jersey, he attended Wilson Elementary School. Around 1993, the Isaacman family moved from Westfield to the Liberty Corner section of Bernards Township. Isaacman attended William Annin Middle School (6–8th grade) from ages 11 to 13, where he met his future wife Monica. He attended Aviation Challenge in Huntsville, Alabama as a child, inspiring his love of aviation.

As a ninth grader and a freshman at Ridge High School in Bernards Township, New Jersey, Isaacman discovered that he and his best friend, Brendan Lauber, had a knack for fixing computers and started a computer repair business in his parents' basement called Deco Systems. He also worked at CompUSA in nearby Somerville, NJ. He had begun working, doing computer technical service and repair, when he was 14. Two years later, that work resulted in an offer of a full-time job from one of his clients, and he chose to drop out of high school to take the job, obtaining a GED along the way.

Business career 
In 1999, Isaacman founded a retail payment processing company named United Bank Card, which was later renamed Harbortouch, a point-of-sale payment company based in Pennsylvania. He was the founding CEO, and retained that role in 2015 with the company having "been profitable for over a decade [while processing]  a year from 60,000 merchants, generating  in revenues." By 2020, the company had been renamed Shift4 Payments, Isaacman remained CEO, and the company was processing  in payments annually.

In 2012, he co-founded Draken International, a Florida-based company that trains pilots for the United States Armed Forces. The company operates one of the world's largest fleets of privately owned fighter jets.

Personal life
In 2004, Isaacman began taking flying lessons. In 2009, he set a world record for circumnavigating the globe. He received a bachelor's degree in professional aeronautics from Embry-Riddle Aeronautical University in 2011. He is flight qualified in multiple military jet aircraft. In his 20s, he flew in many airshows, but by his 30s, he had stopped flying as such.

He is married and has two daughters. Isaacman married Monica of New Jersey in 2011. She went to middle school with Jared, and later worked at UBC. Isaacman entered into a relationship with Monica in 2002.  Isaacman has been a resident of Washington Township, New Jersey.

Personal endeavors

Air show pilot
While in his 20s, Isaacman performed in airshows with the Black Diamond Jet Team.

World record flight
In 2008, he tried to set the world record for circumnavigating the globe in a light jet, falling just short, by traveling around the world in 83 hours, just beyond the existing record of 82 hours. The record attempt was a fundraising event for Make-A-Wish Foundation.

In April 2009, he set a world record for circumnavigating the globe in a light jet, making the flight in 61:51:15, about 20 hours faster than the previous record of 82 hours. The world record attempt was made as a fundraising event for Make-A-Wish Foundation of New Jersey. He flew a Cessna Citation CJ2 with two other crew members, skipping stops in India and Japan, where he encountered hours-long ground delays in his previous attempt in 2008.

Spaceflights

In February 2021, Isaacman announced that he would serve as commander of Inspiration4, the first private human spaceflight in which none of the people aboard are from a government agency. The mission, operated by SpaceX, on board an autonomous Crew Dragon spacecraft launched by a Falcon 9 launch vehicle.

Isaacman received the call sign "Rook" during flight training. He is featured on the cover of a Time magazine double issue with the rest of the crew of Inspiration4 in August 2021. Inspiration4 launched on September 15, 2021 (UTC), achieved orbit and splashed down 3 days later.

During the Inspiration4 mission, Isaacman made history by making the first-known sports bet from space, placing two bets on NFL football with the BetMGM Sportsbook, while over Las Vegas.

Isaacman will return to space on the upcoming Polaris Dawn mission, scheduled for launch no earlier than July 2023. He will become the first astronaut to fly on a Dragon and command its mission for the second time.

See also
 Countdown: Inspiration4 Mission to Space (2021 Netflix documentary series)

References

External links

 Bernards Township, New Jersey Talks about Jared Isaacman Growing Up
 2008/2009 World Record attempts website 
 Tourist Biography: Jared Isaacman (Spacefacts)
 Countdown: Inspiration4: Mission to Space at Netflix
 

1983 births
American astronauts
American chief executives
Commercial astronauts
Embry–Riddle Aeronautical University
Inspiration4
Living people
People from Washington Township, Warren County, New Jersey
Ridge High School alumni
SpaceX astronauts